Conus papuensis is a species of sea snail, a marine gastropod mollusk in the family Conidae, the cone snails and their allies.

Like all species within the genus Conus, these snails are predatory and venomous. They are capable of "stinging" humans, therefore live ones should be handled carefully or not at all.

Description
The size of the shell varies between 19 mm and 36 mm.

Distribution
This marine species occurs off Eastern New Guinea.

References

 Coomans, H. E. and Moolenbeek, R. G. 1982. Studies on Conidae (Mollusca, Gastropoda) 1. Conus papuensis and C. kintoki, two new species from deeper water in the western Pacific. Bulletin Zoologisch Museum Universiteit van Amsterdam 8(15):133–138, 6 figs.
 Puillandre N., Duda T.F., Meyer C., Olivera B.M. & Bouchet P. (2015). One, four or 100 genera? A new classification of the cone snails. Journal of Molluscan Studies. 81: 1–23

External links
 The Conus Biodiversity website
 Cone Shells - Knights of the Sea
 

papuensis
Gastropods described in 1982